All the Roadrunning is a collaboration between British singer-songwriter and guitarist Mark Knopfler and American singer-songwriter Emmylou Harris, released on 24 April 2006 by Mercury Records and Universal Music internationally, and by Warner Bros. Records in the United States. The album received favorable reviews, and reached the number one position on album charts in Denmark, Norway, and Switzerland. The album peaked at number eight in the United Kingdom, and number 17 on the Billboard 200 in the United States. The title track, which actually was released the year before as a new track on the compilation album Private Investigations, was released as a single and reached number 8 in the UK.

"This Is Us" was released as the first single, followed by "Beachcombing". The album was the result of a longtime collaboration between the two artists. Over the course of seven years, the songs were recorded by the pair with minimal information released about the project. A follow-up live album, Real Live Roadrunning, was released following All the Roadrunning Tour.

Background
Mark Knopfler and Emmylou Harris have had long histories of collaborating with and supporting other artists. In addition to 23 solo albums and three successful collaborative albums with Dolly Parton and Linda Ronstadt, Harris has recorded backing and duet vocals with many of the significant recording artists of her generation, including The Band, John Denver, Bob Dylan, Gram Parsons, Townes Van Zandt, Tammy Wynette and Neil Young. Knopfler had also been involved in a number of collaborative projects, recording duets with such artists as Van Morrison and James Taylor, and contributing guitar tracks to numerous recordings by other artists, including The Chieftains, Eric Clapton, Kris Kristofferson, Sonny Landreth, Kate & Anna McGarrigle, Sting, Tina Turner, Steely Dan, and Jimmy Webb. Both shared a love of country music and an admiration for one of country music's guitar masters, Chet Atkins. In 1990, Atkins and Knopfler recorded a collaborative album Neck and Neck, but their friendship went back even further. Knopfler and Harris first met while appearing on a Chet Atkins television special in 1987. They stayed in touch, and about ten years later in Nashville, Knopfler played a few of his songs for Harris, and the idea to record together emerged.

Recording
All the Roadrunning was recorded sporadically over a seven-year period. Two of its tracks, the Cajun-style "Red Staggerwing" and the acoustic ballad "Donkey Town", were originally planned to be included in Knopfler's 2000 solo album Sailing to Philadelphia. On Thanksgiving evening in 1998, at a recording session in Nashville, Knopfler and Harris ran through the two songs with Harris adding her vocals. The session sparked the idea for a collaborative album of duets. Harris later recalled, "When you combine two unique voices it creates a third, phantom voice.... I love the third voice that Mark and I create. We noticed right away that our voices blended pretty effortlessly." Further recording sessions took place in 2002 and 2004, with the pair recording songs from the ground up, supported by some of the best Nashville session players. Their duets album was interrupted by their individual solo projects—Harris's Stumble into Grace in 2003 and Knopfler's Shangri-La in 2004—and their supporting tours and promotional activities.

Composition
"If This Is Goodbye" is based on the last telephone calls to loved ones from the passengers of United Airlines Flight 93, which crashed in Pennsylvania on September 11, 2001, after being hijacked by terrorists.

Touring

Knopfler and Harris supported the release of All the Roadrunning with the All the Roadrunning Tour of Europe and North America, which started on 26 May 2006 in Brussels, Belgium, and included 23 concerts in 23 cities, ending in Berkeley, California, on 30 June 2006. The tour lineup included Mark Knopfler (guitar, vocals), Emmylou Harris (guitar, vocals), Guy Fletcher (keyboards), Richard Bennett (guitar), Stuart Duncan (fiddle, mandolin), Matt Rollings (keyboards), Glenn Worf (bass), and Danny Cummings (drums). The concert on 28 June 2006 at the Gibson Amphitheatre in Los Angeles was recorded and released as a live album and DVD, Real Live Roadrunning, on 14 November 2006 by Mercury Records and Universal Music internationally, and by Warner Bros. Records in the United States.

Critical response

In his review for the Winnipeg Sun, Darryl Sterdan gave the album four out of five stars, calling the collaboration a "match made in heaven". Sterdan continued:

Sterdan praised Knopfler's songwriting on the album, especially "This is Us", "Right Now", and the "Celtic-tinged bluegrass" of "Red Staggerwing". Sterdan also noted Knopfler's production, approaching the project with a lighter touch than on his past projects, and wisely reining in his signature guitar work enough to highlight Harris' singing.

In his review for The Telegraph, Neil McCormick wrote that Knopfler and Harris recorded a "remarkable new album" that is a "collection of rich, mature songs that reflect their combined life experiences", and that is "one of the best albums of both their careers".

In his review for Entertainment Weekly, Josh Tyrangiel gave the album a B− score, writing that the two artists "seem oddly matched" and that Knopfler's guitarwork tends to overwhelm Harris' vocals.

Track listing
All songs were written by Mark Knopfler, except where indicated.

Personnel
Music
 Mark Knopfler – vocals, guitar
 Emmylou Harris – vocals, acoustic guitar (5,9)
 Richard Bennett – guitar
 Jim Cox – keyboards
 Guy Fletcher – keyboards
 Dan Dugmore – acoustic guitar (6,12), pedal steel guitar (5,10), six-string bass (9)
 Paul Franklin – pedal steel guitar (3)
 Stuart Duncan – fiddle (4), mandolin
 Steve Conn – accordion (4)
 Billy Ware – triangle (4)
 Glenn Worf – bass 
 Chad Cromwell – drums
 Danny Cummings – drums
 Jim Horn and The Memphis Horns – horns (12)

Production
 Mark Knopfler – producer
 Chuck Ainlay – producer, recording engineer, mixing
 Guy Fletcher – recording engineer
 Mark Kapps – recording engineer (horns)
 John Saylor – assistant recording engineer
 Mark Ralston – assistant recording engineer
 Rupert Coulson – mixing assistant
 Graham Meek – technical support 
 Maria Verel – hair and makeup for Ms. Harris
 Fabio Iovino – photography

Charts

Weekly charts

Year-end charts

Certifications

References

External links
 All the Roadrunning at Mark Knopfler official website

Mark Knopfler albums
Emmylou Harris albums
2006 albums
Albums produced by Chuck Ainlay
Albums produced by Mark Knopfler
Warner Records albums
Mercury Records albums
Collaborative albums